The National Defence University named after the First President of the Republic of Kazakhstan - Elbasi (Qazaqstan Respýblıkasy Tuńǵysh Prezıdenti atyndaǵy Ulttyq qorǵanys ýnıversıteti - Elbasy) also known commonly as the National Defence University is a higher military educational institution for the training of senior officers in Kazakhstan's Armed Forces. It enrolls state officials, executive authorities, and officers of foreign armies. The main tasks of the NDU are to train officers to become professionals in the armed forces. It is currently led by the former head of the Kazakh artillery forces, Major General Lut Alchekenov.

History 
On February 11, 1997,  the government issued an order to establish the Military Academy of the Armed Forces of Kazakhstan on the basis of the Alma-Ata Higher All-Arms Command School and was based in Shchuchinsk. In June of that same year, the regulations of the academy, as well as its tasks were issued. On August 21, 2003, by decree of President Nursultan Nazarbayev, the Military Academy of the Armed Forces of Kazakhstan was transformed National Defense University. In early 2014, the university was relocated from Shchuchinsk to the capital of Astana. On July 3, 2014, the NDU was named after the first and current President of Kazakhstan, Nursultan Nazarbayev and on April 15, 2015, the NDU joined the Association of European Universities.

Role

The NDU within the CSTO
On November 30, 2005, the Collective Security Treaty Organization included the university in its list of educational institutions for joint training of military personnel  of the CSTO. As of 2018, students from Kyrgyzstan, Armenia, and Tajikistan are studying at the NDU.

Structure

Training in the NDU is carried out in 4 faculties:

 Faculty of the General Staff of the Armed Forces
 Department of Military and Public Administration
 Department of Strategy
 Department of Military and Public Administration
 Department of Operational Art
 Department of Command

 Faculty of Management
 Department of Operational and Tactical Training
 Department of Command and Control of Troops
 Department of Missile Forces and Artillery
 Department of Air Defense Forces
 Department of Material and Technical Support
 Department of Physical Training and Sports

 Faculty of the National Guard
 Department of Operational and Tactical Training

 Faculty of Advanced Training
 Academic Courses
 Courses for officers of Regional Commands;
 Courses for Brigade Commanders
 Courses for Battalion Commanders
 Foreign Language Courses

Important persons

Directors 

 Colonel General Saken Zhasuzakov (7 August 2018 – 7 August 2019)
 Lieutenant General Sultan Kamaletdinov (18 October 2019 – March 2020)
 Major General Lut Alchekenov (since March 2020)

Alumni 
 Major General Kanysh Abubakirov, Commander of the Kazakh Airmobile Forces
Kaidar Karakulov
Murat Bektanov, Chief of the General Staff

See also 
 Ministry of Defense of Kazakhstan
 Armed Forces of the Republic of Kazakhstan
 Military Institute of the Kazakh Ground Forces
 Astana Zhas Ulan Republican School

References

External links 
 Official website

Educational institutions established in 1997
Military academies of Kazakhstan
1997 establishments in Kazakhstan